Double Fold: Libraries and the Assault on Paper is a non-fiction book by Nicholson Baker that was published in April 2001. An excerpt appeared in the July 24, 2000 issue of The New Yorker, under the title "Deadline: The Author's Desperate Bid to Save America's Past." This exhaustively researched work (there are 63 pages of endnotes and 18 pages of references in the paperback edition) details Baker's quest to uncover the fate of thousands of books and newspapers that were replaced and often destroyed during the microfilming boom of the 1980s and 1990s. Double Fold is a controversial work and is not meant to be objective. In the preface, Baker says, "This isn't an impartial piece of reporting", (preface p. x) and The New York Times characterized the book as a "blistering and thoroughly idiosyncratic attack".

Overview
The term "double fold" refers to the test used by many librarians and preservation administrators to determine the brittleness and "usability" of paper. The test consists of folding down the corner of a page of a book or newspaper, then folding it back in the opposite direction—one double fold. The action is then repeated until the paper breaks or is about to break. The test yields a fold number. (In the late 1960s, preservation founding father William Barrow was fond of using a machine-run fold tester to back up his claims about the number of endangered books.) This experiment was used by library officials to identify their institution's brittle books, and, in some case, to justify withdrawing items from the shelves or replacing them with another format (most often microfilm). Baker describes the double fold test as "...utter horseshit and craziness. A leaf of a book is a semi-pliant mechanism. It was made for non-acute curves, not for origami." (p. 157).

Double Fold chapter titles include "Destroying to Preserve," "It Can Be Brutal," "Dingy, Dreary, Dog-Eared and Dead," "Thugs and Pansies," "3.3 Million Books, 358 Million Dollars" and  "Absolute Nonsense." Throughout the book, Baker argues against the destruction of books and newspapers by the institutions that, to his mind, should be held responsible for their preservation. He brings to light the tension between preservation and access: which should be the priority? Are libraries responsible for keeping books whole, for retaining books that may be in danger of falling apart, or are they mandated to do whatever is in their power to increase access to their holdings, possibly moving them to other media through methods such as microfilm or digitization, and sometimes destroying them in the process? Baker claims these goals need not conflict: "Why can't we have the benefits of the new and extravagantly expensive digital copy and keep the convenience and beauty and historical testimony of the original books resting on the shelves, where they've always been, thanks to the sweat and equity of our prescient predecessors?" (p. 67).

Reviews and accolades
Double Fold won the National Book Critics Circle Award for Nonfiction in 2001, and received positive reviews from The New York Times, Salon.com, and the New York Review of Books. The Library Journal gave the book a good review, recommending it for libraries everywhere.

Major themes
Baker targets many established and revered institutions in Double Fold, including the British Library, the Library of Congress, and the New York Public Library. He accuses these libraries, and many others, of neglecting to preserve the world's cultural heritage (through their policies of discarding original materials once they've been microfilmed) and of creating cumbersome barriers to scholarship and research (in the form of tough-to-read and often incomplete microfilm).

Other targets of Baker's ire include the highly regarded Brittle Books Program, the United States Newspaper Program, the mass deacidification policy practiced by the Library of Congress, and the 1987 film Slow Fires: On the Preservation of the Human Record. (He calls the film "the most successful piece of library propaganda ever created." p. 184).

Baker's issue with microfilming is not so much with the process in and of itself ("there is nothing intrinsically wrong with microfilming...(it) can be extremely useful" p. 25) -- but with the disbinding (sometimes known as "guillotining") and discarding that often went hand-in-hand with the procedure. Baker laments the loss of thousands of volumes of significant 19th- and 20th-century newspapers: the Brooklyn Eagle, the New York Herald Tribune, the New York World, the Philadelphia Public Ledger, The New York Times, and many others. His other problems with microfilm include cost ("Compared to storing the originals in some big building, microfilming is wildly expensive" p. 26),  the poor quality of some of the images ("edge-blurred, dark, gappy, with text cut off of some pages, faded to the point of illegibility on others" p. 14), and the sheer frustration of dealing with the technology ("microfilm is a brain-poaching, gorge-lifting trial to browse" p. 39).

Thoughts about librarians and preservationists
Christened the "Erin Brockovich of the library world" by The New York Times, Baker is not shy about placing blame on the custodians of the nation's heritage and intellect: "The library has gone astray partly because we trusted the librarians so completely." (p. 104). Double Fold was viewed by many as a scathing indictment of librarians and libraries everywhere. The author takes to task many past and present prominent librarians and preservationists, including Verner Clapp, Fremont Rider, Patricia Battin, and Pamela Darling.

Baker displays a particular distaste for library officials who advanced the notion that thousands upon thousands of books and newspapers were on the verge of disintegrating right before our eyes: "...librarians have lied shamelessly about the extent of paper's fragility, and they continue to lie about it" (p. 41). He argues that old books and newspapers—even those printed on acidic paper—can survive much longer than many experts predicted, and that librarians who claim otherwise were being alarmist, and were misguided in their attempts to justify getting rid of books deemed unhealthy. (A Preservation Directorate issued by the Library of Congress in May 2001 painted a different picture, stating that many modern books and newspapers printed on acidic paper were in imminent danger of decay.) Moreover, Baker claims that discarding policies at libraries were frequently the result of increasing pressure on librarians to save space on their shelves, although many were reluctant to admit that space was the critical issue.

Reactions
Librarians were quick to defend themselves and their profession, in journal articles and elsewhere, against Baker's accusations.
The Association of Research Libraries (ARL) maintains a web page, "Nicholson Baker, Reviews and Responses", that compiles letters to editors, reviews of Double Fold, interviews, and articles in response to Baker's arguments, including a "Q and A" in response to the book, with questions such as "How accurate are Baker's claims about the durability of paper?" (answer: it depends) and "Should libraries collect and save everything published?" (answer: a fairly resounding "no").  In a Letter to the Editor in the New York Review of Books, Shirley K. Baker, a librarian writing on behalf of ARL, stresses that preservation decisions occur in a larger institutional context, and are concerned with more than just microfilm.  She writes that "Despite limited budgets, the uncertainties of new technology, and other compelling institutional priorities, librarians have used the best knowledge and materials available at any given time to develop a broad array of preservation strategies."

In an editorial titled "Baker's Book Is Half-Baked," published in the May 15, 2001 issue of Library Journal, Francine Fialkoff starts by stating "Nicholson Baker doesn't get it" and goes on to say that Baker ignores the fact that libraries serve people, not products: "However admirable his effort to preserve newspapers and books and to ensure that original copies of every publication be retained, he doesn't understand -- and perhaps never will -- that the purpose of libraries is access."

A month later, in the June 1, 2001 issue of Library Journal, Baker got the chance to respond to librarians in an interview with writer Andrew Richard Albanese. In the interview Baker denies charges of "librarian bashing" and points out that some reviewers of Double Fold had misrepresented his opinions. He says that librarians may be reading these misguided reviews and taking offense without having read the book itself.

 "...I do think there have been some librarians who had a different idea of the direction libraries should go. Patricia Battin is one example. In my opinion, she hugely inflated a crisis in order to extract what was essentially disaster relief money from Congress. I don't think she acted with ill intentions, it's just that what she wanted to do resulted in the destruction of things libraries ought to be hanging onto...there were people who acted irresponsibly because they were caught up in the excitement of revolutionizing the distribution of information. And as a result things that we can never get back were destroyed." (p. 103)
 "I wanted to change the way librarians think about some of these collections and the nature of keeping things. I wanted to get the truth on the page so people could begin discussing these issues in an intelligent way. We have to learn what actually happened to these collections, so I wanted to tell the story in great detail of who did what and why. Having told that story, I would like librarians around the country to take seriously what's on their shelves." (p. 104)
 "There's an awful lot of stuff in this book. It is not the kind of fierce attack that it is being portrayed to be by the people who want to defuse it. There is a beleaguered feeling among librarians because people are assuming I'm saying things I'm actually not saying...I'm just trying to tell the history of some mistakes that we ought to be able to learn from as we go into this major phase of digital scanning." (p. 104)
 "There is nothing wrong with taking pictures of any library holding; it's what you do with the thing itself after you're done taking pictures that occupies my attention." (p. 104)
 "I really do love libraries. I want them to be funded. and I want them to have enough money to store what we want them to store and have the kind of invaluable reference services that they have offered in the past." (p. 104)

Later that year, Baker got another chance to respond to librarians when he was invited to speak at the annual American Library Association conference in San Francisco. He called himself a "library activist" and reiterated the need for libraries to retain last copies, as well as originals.

Richard Cox, a professor and archivist from the University of Pittsburgh, was sufficiently taken aback by Double Fold that he chose to respond with a book of his own. Vandals in the Stacks: A Response to Nicholson Baker's Assault on Libraries was published in 2002.  In 2000, Cox published a critique of Double Fold called "The Great Newspaper Caper: Backlash in the Digital Age" that appeared in the internet journal First Monday. Both the article and the book provide harsh criticisms of Baker's research and findings. Cox admits that Baker is "well-meaning" and that some good could come from an elevation of the public discourse about preservation issues, but he also maintains that "the problems are much more complex than Mr. Baker understands or cares to discuss."  He writes: "one can believe in the continuing utility of print and the value of maintaining books and some newspapers in their original condition, while recognizing that the ultimate preservation demands requires mechanisms like microfilming and digitization projects", and worries that Baker's focus on original formats will "divert the public's attention from the greater issues facing the preservation of the books, documents, newspapers, and other artifacts of the past."

Marlene Manoff takes Baker to task by questioning the importance of such a claim. She writes: "What precisely is at stake here? Why have both the scholarly and popular press recently taken this sudden interest in libraries? Why this concern for the historical record? ... Because museums also exist to preserve our cultural heritage, they have been on the receiving end of similar kinds of invective. Museums, like libraries, are adapting to transformations in the larger culture. Mass audiences and corporate sponsorship have become their primary engines of growth and survival. Museums and libraries both are wrestling with the need to democratize and to expand their audiences and to find new sources of funding. Both are exploiting new technologies to transform their internal operations and the nature of the materials and services they provide." Manoff notes that "discarding books and newspapers, however serious a problem, is not itself the destruction of history" but also acknowledges that the call for libraries to take on a stronger role in preserving the historical record, and not only focus on technological trends, is a valid demand.

Conclusions
In 1999, Baker took matters into his own hands and founded the American Newspaper Repository in order to save some of the collections being auctioned off by the British Library. A year later he became the owner of thousands of volumes of old newspapers, including various runs of The New York Times, the Chicago Tribune, the New York Herald Tribune, and the New York World. In May 2004 the entire collection was moved to Duke University, where it is stored on climate-controlled shelves and looked after by the Rare Books and Special Collections division. As part of the gift agreement between the American Newspaper Repository and Duke, the collection will be kept together in perpetuity, and no disbinding or experimental deacidification will be allowed.

Baker makes four recommendations in Double Fold epilogue: that libraries should be required to publish lists of discarded holdings on their websites, that the Library of Congress should fund a building that will serve as a storage repository for publications and documents not housed on-site, that some U.S. libraries should be designated with saving newspapers in bound form, and that both the U.S. Newspaper and the Brittle Books Programs should be abolished, unless they can promise that all conservation procedures will be non-destructive and that originals will be saved.

Quotations
 "We have...lost intellectual content as a direct result of our massive effort to preserve it." (p. 260)
 "The ability to summon words from distant, normally unreachable sources, which can be a fine thing for scholarship, is being linked to the compulsory removal of local physical access, which is a terrible thing for scholarship." (p. 257)
 "The truth is that certain purificationally destructive transformations of old things into new things seem to excite people -- otherwise polite, educated, law-abiding people -- and it's up to other normally polite people to try to stop them." (p. 54)
 "As a very rough, lowball guess, thirty-nine million dollars' worth of originals left our nation's libraries, thanks to federal largesse. It's as if the National Park Service felled vast wild tracts of pointed firs and replaced them with plastic Christmas trees." (p. 238).
 "The second major wave of book wastage and mutilation, comparable to the microfilm wave but potentially much more extensive, is just beginning..." (p. 247)

See also 
 Book scanning

Bibliography
 Nicholson Baker. (2001). Double Fold: Libraries and the Assault on Paper. Vintage Books/Random House. .

References

External links
 American Newspaper Repository, Rubenstein Rare Book and Manuscript Library, Duke University
 American Newspaper Repository original site
 Association of Research Libraries: Q&A in response to Double Fold
 Association of Research Libraries: Talking Points in Response to Nicholson Baker's New Yorker article
 The Library of Congress Preservation Directorate
 Library Journal review of Double Fold
 Remarks at ALA Conference 2001
 Salon.com review of Double Fold
 Society of American Archivists Review of Vandals in the Stacks
 G. Thomas Tanselle, "Reproductions and Scholarship," Studies in Bibliography 42 (1989): 25-54

2001 non-fiction books
American non-fiction books
Preservation (library and archival science)
Random House books
2001 controversies
Controversies in the United States
Culture-related controversies
Literature controversies
British Library
Library of Congress
New York Public Library